Mother is a 1951 Iranian drama film directed by Esmail Koushan.

Cast
 Abdullah Baghaie 
 Ali-Asghar Berenji 
 Alexander Bijanian 
 Delkash

References

Bibliography 
 Mohammad Ali Issari. Cinema in Iran, 1900-1979. Scarecrow Press, 1989.

External links 
 

1951 films
Iranian black-and-white films
1950s Persian-language films
Films directed by Esmail Kushan
Iranian drama films
1951 drama films